Neill Blomkamp (born 17 September 1979) is a South African-Canadian filmmaker. He is best known as the co-writer and director of the science fiction action film District 9, for which he was nominated for the Academy Award for Best Adapted Screenplay, and the director of the dystopian science fiction action film Elysium, which garnered moderately positive reviews.

Blomkamp employs a documentary-style, hand-held, cinéma vérité technique, blending naturalistic and photo-realistic computer-generated effects, and his films often deal with themes of xenophobia and social segregation. He is also known for his collaborations with actor Sharlto Copley.

Time named Blomkamp as one of the 100 Most Influential People of 2009. A 2011 article in Forbes named him as the 21st most powerful celebrity from Africa.

Early life
Blomkamp was born in Johannesburg, South Africa. At the age of sixteen, he met Sharlto Copley, who had also attended Redhill High School in Johannesburg. Copley provided Blomkamp with the use of computers at his production company for Blomkamp to pursue his passion and talent for 3D animation and design. In return, Blomkamp assisted Copley in creating 3D work for pitches on various projects. Blomkamp was 18 when he moved to Vancouver with his family, where he enrolled at the Vancouver Film School.

Career
In the late 1990s, he started working in the film industry as a special effects artist and 3D animator. His animation credits include Stargate SG-1 (1998), First Wave (1998), Mercy Point (1998) and Aftershock: Earthquake in New York (1999). In 2000, he garnered his first role of lead animator for the Dark Angel TV series (2000). He was the lead 3D animator for 3000 Miles to Graceland (2001).

In 2003, he was hired to illustrate photo-realistic future aircraft for Popular Science'''s "Next Century in Aviation". In 2004, he illustrated "The Future of the Automobile". Blomkamp worked as a visual effects artist at The Embassy Visual Effects in Vancouver as well as at Rainmaker Digital Effects, and was signed by Toronto commercial house Spy Films. Blomkamp directed a trilogy of live-action short films in 2007, known collectively as Landfall. They were set in the Halo universe, to promote the release of Halo 3.

Blomkamp was then slated to direct his first feature-length film, an adaptation of the Halo series of video games, produced by Peter Jackson. Jackson came to know of Blomkamp after viewing a reel of his commercial work and shorts, shot in his off time. The four shorts that got him noticed included: Tetra Vaal, a faux advertisement for a third-world police robot that established Blomkamp's signature style of mixing lo-fi production with seamless CGI; Alive in Joburg, a gritty mockumentary about extraterrestrials marooned in Johannesburg; Tempbot, an Office Space-esque spoof; and Yellow, a short film based on the colour yellow for Adidas' "Adicolor" campaign by digital studio IDEALOGUE, which portrays a globe-trotting android gone rogue.

Blomkamp has admitted since that the Halo pre-production was a nightmare, and relations between 20th Century Fox and Blomkamp severely disintegrated before the project's end. When funding for the Halo film collapsed, Peter Jackson decided to produce District 9 instead, an adaptation of Blomkamp's earlier short film Alive in Joburg, which had been produced by Hansen and Copley. The film, directed by Blomkamp, starring Copley, and co-written with Blomkamp's wife and production partner Terri Tatchell, was released in mid-August 2009 by TriStar Pictures to widespread critical acclaim. District 9 was later nominated for the 2010 Academy Award for Best Picture, along with nominations for Best Visual Effects, Editing, and Adapted Screenplay.

In October 2010, a video released on the iPad version of Wired Magazine was credited to Neill Blomkamp. It shows an amateur recording of two young men who find a dead mutated creature in a puddle of mud while driving down a countryside road. The creature, a dog-sized mix between a pig and a lizard, presents a tattooed seal on its side that reads "18.12 AGM Heartland Pat. Pend. USA". "AGM Heartland" was trademarked for its use in an entertainment-oriented website. On 20 February 2012, a 23-second video clip titled "IS IT DEAD?" appeared on YouTube, featuring Yolandi Visser, of the South African group Die Antwoord, crouching over the creature. Blomkamp admitted that he was still interested in making a Halo film in April 2013.
 
After Elysium, he started work on his next sci-fi film, Chappie, in April 2013. The film was based on his own short, Tetra Vaal. Blomkamp directed and Sony Pictures Entertainment (Columbia Pictures) and Media Rights Capital co-produced and co-financed the film, which was released March 2015.

In early 2015, Blomkamp posted several pictures to his Instagram page that showed concept art for an Alien film he might have been working on. Included in the art is Ripley and Hicks, a ship bearing resemblance to The Derelict from the 1979 Alien, and a concept Xenomorph. In a February 2015 interview with Collider,  he stated that he planned the Alien sequel with Sigourney Weaver in the lead role as Ellen Ripley. On 18 February 2015, Blomkamp himself confirmed that the Alien film will be his next project. In March 2015, he confirmed that he planned more than one sequel to the Alien franchise. The project was shelved in October 2015, pending the outcome of Ridley Scott's second prequel installment, Alien: Covenant. In January 2017, a fan on Twitter asked Blomkamp about the outlook of the film going into production, he responded by saying they were "slim".  On 1 May 2017, its title had been revealed to be Alien: Awakening. Though Ridley Scott initially confirmed Blomkamp's film had been officially canceled, 20th Century Fox may reconsider after the fan reception of Covenant. Fans of the franchise have started a petition to help save Blomkamp's cancelled film. As of June 2020, there's no update on whether the planned and cancelled film is being revived.

In November 2015, it was announced that Blomkamp would be working on adapting the forthcoming Tom Sweterlitsch novel The Gone World, described as a "sci-fi time travel" concept, but the film was either subsequently scrapped or stuck in "development hell," with production never going forward.

In 2017, Blomkamp announced the creation of his own film production company, Oats Studios, and confirmed a series of experimental short films and other content titled Oats Studios Volume 1 to be released via Steam. The films will also be available for free streaming on YouTube. These films are distributed to gauge interest in a certain theme, with the intention to expand them into a feature film if deemed viable. The first short, an alien invasion-themed film co-written with Sweterlitsch, is titled Rakka.

In July 2018, Blomkamp announced that he would be directing a new entry in the RoboCop film series for Metro-Goldwyn-Mayer. The film was to be adapted from a previously-unproduced spec script written in the late 1980s by Edward Neumeier and Michael Miner, the writers of the first film, who were slated to executive produce the film. Tentatively titled RoboCop Returns, the film was to serve as a direct sequel to the first film, ignoring 1990's RoboCop 2 and 1993's RoboCop 3, as well as the 2014 remake. On 15 August 2019, Blomkamp announced on Twitter that he is no longer directing RoboCop Returns as he is focusing on directing a horror movie instead.

In December 2020, it was revealed that Blomkamp had secretly shot a supernatural horror film, Demonic, in British Columbia during the summer of 2020 amidst the COVID-19 pandemic.

In August 2021 it was confirmed that the sequel to District 9 was in the works but that the script was still under development. In 2022 it was announced that he would direct the sports film Gran Turismo based on the video game and the true story of Jann Mardenborough

Personal life
Blomkamp is married to Terri Tatchell, a Canadian screenwriter, best known for co-writing the screenplay of District 9. She was nominated for the Academy Award for Best Adapted Screenplay with Blomkamp at the 82nd Academy Awards.

Filmography
Feature films

Commercials

Short films

Other roles

Recognition
2004, Cannes Lions International Advertising Festival - "Saatchi & Saatchi New Directors Showcase"
2004, First Boards Awards - "One of the top five directors to watch"
2004, Shark Awards (shortlisted)
2005, VES awards "Outstanding VFX in a commercial" for Citroën - Alive with technology2008, Cannes Lions 2008 - Film Lions- Grand Prix - Halo: Combat2009, Nominated - Golden Globe Award for Best Screenplay - District 92009, Nominated - Satellite Award for Best Director & Satellite Award for Best Adapted Screenplay - District 92009, Won - Bradbury Award from the Science Fiction and Fantasy Writers of America - District 92010, Nominated - Academy Award for Best Adapted Screenplay, Nominated - Academy Award for Best Picture 2009 - District 9'' (written by Neill Blomkamp and Terri Tatchell)

Reception
Critical, public, and commercial reception to films Blomkamp has directed:

References

External links
 
 Neill Blomkamp interview at AMCtv.com
 Neill Blomkamp interview with Comic-Con
 Neill Blomkamp talking District 9 at FEARnet
 Website for Spy Films productions

1979 births
Living people
Afrikaner people
Artists from Vancouver
Action film directors
Canadian people of Afrikaner descent
People from Johannesburg
Film directors from Vancouver
Nebula Award winners
Science fiction film directors
South African emigrants to Canada
South African film directors
Visual effects artists